The War Memorial in Hanoi is located across the Ba Dinh Square, across the Ho Chi Minh Mausoleum and close to Hanoi Citadel. Constructed in 1993 in a fusion of traditional Vietnamese and modernist architecture, the memorial commemorates men and women who sacrificed themselves during the Vietnam War. The war is known by many names, e.g. as the American War in Vietnam. The memorial is a focal point for state functions, commemorating the war dead.

See also 
 List of war museums and monuments in Vietnam
 Vietnam Veterans Memorial in Washington, DC
 Terminology of the Vietnam War

References

External links 

Buildings and structures in Hanoi
Vietnam War memorials
Tourist attractions in Hanoi
Monuments and memorials in Vietnam